A Monster with a Thousand Heads is a 2015 Mexican thriller film, directed and produced by Rodrigo Plá and written by Laura Santullo. The film stars Jana Raluy, as a wife desperate to beat the bureaucracy, when her insurance company refuses to approve the care her husband needs to survive.

A Monster with a Thousand Heads premiered at the 72nd Venice Film Festival as the opening film of the Orizzonti section. The film also received seven nominations for the Ariel Awards in Mexico, including Best Picture, Best Direction and Best Actress, winning one for Best Adapted Screenplay. The film was named on the shortlist for Mexico's entry for the Academy Award for Best Foreign Language Film at the 89th Academy Awards, but it was not selected.

Plot
Sonia Bonet (Jana Raluy) tries to take justice into her own hands after a health-insurance company named Alta Salud refuses to approve the care of her dying spouse. She and her son Dario (Sebastián Aguirre) attempt to fight the system, forcing the company employees to perform the corresponding procedure.

Cast
Jana Raluy as Sonia Bonet
Sebastián Aguirre as Dario
Emilio Echevarría as Enrique Sandoval Núñez
Hugo Albores as Dr. Villalba
Daniel Giménez Cacho as Nicolás Pietro
Daniel Cubillo as Memo (Sonia's husband)
Veronica Falcón as Lorena Morgan
Úrsula Pruneda as Mónica
Noé Hernández as Doorman
Harold Torres as Police Agent 1
Marisol Centeno as Lorena Morgan's assistant
Tenoch Huerta Mejía as Prosecutor (voice)

Production
A Monster with a Thousand Heads is the fourth feature film from Uruguayan-Mexican director Rodrigo Plá, following La Zona (2007), 
Desierto Adentro (2008) and La Demora (2012). The screenplay was written by Laura Santullo, based on her novel of the same title. The main actors, Jana Raluy and Sebastian Aguirre, recreate "desperate characters" without 
exaggerated gestures and postures, "enhancing their work", according to Columba Vértiz de la Fuente of Proceso. The actors read the novel beforehand and rehearsed many times before shooting. Raluy stated that her father died of cancer shortly before the filming started, and that helped her to create her character. About the storyline, screenwriter Santullo exposed that they [Plá and herself] tried to make "an honest movie about the things we think and the concerns we have. So we talk about public and private health, a topic very delicate in the country and the world."

Response

Critical response
The film was the opening film of the Orizzonti section at the 72nd Venice Film Festival. After this premiere, Boyd van Hoeij of The Hollywood Reporter wrote on his review that the film is "a lean and efficient mix of thriller, drama and socio-political commentary", and also praised the leading work of actress Jana Raluy, stating that she "displays the right mix of craziness and steamrolling strength to appear dangerous, even though the awkward way she holds a gun clearly indicates she’s a fed-up hausfrau reduced to desperate measures, not a trained killer." The reviewer commented on director Rodrigo Plá and cinematographer Obei Zabaleta, who "use their widescreen canvas beautifully". José Luis García of Cinestel said that the film has "certain moments of black humor that help lighten the dramatic burden of social criticism". The Mexican premiere of the film was held at the 13th Morelia International Film Festival on October 24, 2015, and by participating in this festival, the Mexican Academy of Film Arts and Sciences was able to nominate it for seven categories at the Ariel Awards of 2016, including Best Director, Best Screenplay, Best Actress and Best Picture.

Awards and nominations

References

External links
 

2015 films
2015 crime drama films
Mexican crime drama films
2010s Spanish-language films
2010s Mexican films